The 2005–06 Japan Figure Skating Championships were the 74th edition of the event. They were held between December 23 and 25, 2005 at the Yoyogi National Gymnasium in Tokyo. Skaters competed in the disciplines of men's singles, ladies' singles, and ice dancing on the senior level. This event was used to determine the teams for the 2006 Winter Olympics, the 2006 World Championships, and the 2006 Four Continents Championships. The level of competition was Senior-level only. Juniors competed at the Japan Junior Figure Skating Championships, where the top three advanced to the 2006 World Junior Championships.

Notes
 Because of an error in the scoring system software, Nobunari Oda was originally declared the winner of the men's event, with Daisuke Takahashi placing second. Oda had done four combination jumps instead of the allowed three, but the software had counted the fourth combination jump. When the error was discovered and fixed, their placements switched, with Takahashi winning the event and being sent to the Olympics. Oda was sent to World Championships. Japan had only one entry to the Olympics and to the World Championships in the men's event.
 Despite her 2nd-place finish, Mao Asada was not chosen for the Olympic, World, or Four Continents team, because she was not old enough. She was instead sent back to Junior Worlds.

Results

Men

Ladies

Ice dancing

Japan Junior Figure Skating Championships
The 2005–06 Japan Junior Figure Skating Championships were held between December 10 and 11, 2005 at the Big Hat in Nagano.

The following skaters placed high enough at Novice Nationals to be invited to compete here: Satoshi Nakamura (1st in novice A boys, 20th in junior), Ayane Nakamura (1st in novice A girls, 9th in junior), Yuki Nishino (2nd in novice A girls, 16th in junior), and Miruku Matsushita (3rd in novice A girls, 14th in junior).

Men

Ladies

Ice dancing

International team selections

Winter Olympics
The picking of the Olympic Ladies team used a complicated formula that took into consideration the season as a whole along with other previous competitions, not just the results of the National Championships. Therefore, sixth-place finisher Miki Ando was chosen ahead of fourth-place finisher Yoshie Onda and fifth-place finisher Yukari Nakano. However, Nakano was picked ahead of Ando for the World team.

World Championships

Four Continents Championships

External links
 2005–06 Japan Figure Skating Championships results
 2005–06 Japan Junior Figure Skating Championships results 

Japan Figure Skating Championships
2006 in figure skating
2005 in figure skating
2005 in Japanese sport